William Ayres Reynolds (December 30, 1874 – August 10, 1928) was an American football player and coach of football and baseball. He played scrub football at Princeton University, serving as team captain in 1894, and served as the head football coach at Rutgers University (1895), Sewanee: The University of the South (1895), the University of Cincinnati (1896), the University of North Carolina (1897–1900), and the University of Georgia (1901–1902), compiling a career record of 38–21–9. Reynolds was also the head baseball coach at North Carolina (1898–1899) and Georgia (1902–1903), tallying a career mark of 24–14–2.

At North Carolina, as a football coach, he coached the Tar Heels to an undefeated season in 1898 (9–0) and had an overall record of 27–7–4 during his four seasons. As a baseball coach, Reynolds compiled a 21–5–1 record in two seasons at North Carolina.

Reynolds did not enjoy the same level of success at Georgia in either sport. As the Georgia football head coach, he compiled a record of just 5–7–3 during his two-year stay. As a baseball coach, Reynolds fared better, posting a 13–9–1 record over two seasons.

Reynolds left Georgia in 1903 to pursue a business opportunity in Canada. He was later the vice president of the Southern Cotton Oil Co, original manufacturers of Wesson cooking oil. He died on August 10, 1928, at his home in Charlotte, North Carolina.

Head coaching record

Football

References

External links

1874 births
1928 deaths
19th-century players of American football
Cincinnati Bearcats football coaches
Georgia Bulldogs baseball coaches
Georgia Bulldogs football coaches
North Carolina Tar Heels baseball coaches
North Carolina Tar Heels football coaches
Princeton Tigers football players
People from Oxford, Pennsylvania
Players of American football from Pennsylvania
Rutgers Scarlet Knights football coaches
Sewanee Tigers football coaches